Optimus Prime is an American science fiction comic book series written by John Barber, with art by penciller Kei Zama and colorist Josh Burcham. It is published by IDW Publishing in collaboration with Hasbro.

The series is a direct continuation to The Transformers: Robots in Disguise, featuring Optimus Prime as the main protagonist, and is set in the Hasbro Comic Book Universe.

The first issue was released on December 14, 2016 alongside Transformers: Lost Light as part of the Hasbro Reconstruction comic book line. The final issue was released on November 21, 2018, in the announcement of a reboot series for 2019.

Plot

Volume 1: New Cybertron

Volume 2

Volume 3: First Strike, Primeless, and The Dead Come Home

Volume 4: The Falling

Volume 5: The Coming of Unicron

Reception
According to review aggregator Comic Book Roundup, the first issue scored an average of 8.2/10 based on 10 reviews, while the series as a whole averaged 7.6/10 based on 66 reviews. The first issue received generally positive reviews for both Barber's script and Zama's art from ComicsVerse, IGN, and Comicosity.

Collected edition

Notes

References

2016 comics debuts
2018 comics endings
IDW Publishing titles
Rom the Space Knight
Transformers comics